Dampier may refer to:
 Dampier, Western Australia – a port in the Pilbara region
 Division of Dampier, an electoral division in Western Australia from 1913 to 1922
 Dampier County, one of the 141 cadastral divisions of New South Wales in Australia
 Dampier (surname)
 William Dampier (1651–1715), explorer
 14876 Dampier, a minor planet named after William Dampier
 Mount Dampier: the third peak in South Island of New Zealand